The Center of Expertise on Gender Dysphoria (CEGD), or the Kennis- en Zorgcentrum Genderdysforie (KZcG), is a transgender clinic at the VU University Medical Center (VUMC) of the Vrije Universiteit Amsterdam in Amsterdam, Netherlands. It opened in 1972 and is one of the largest transgender clinics and research institutes in the world. As of 2021, it has treated about 10,000 transgender people since it opened almost 50 years previously. The clinic was first headed by Louis Gooren.

See also
 European Network for the Investigation of Gender Incongruence (ENIGI)

References

External links
 Center of Expertise on Gender Dypshoria - VUMC
 Kennis- en Zorgcentrum Genderdysforie - VUMC

Vrije Universiteit Amsterdam
Transgender and medicine